Ranchi railway division is one of the four railway divisions under South Eastern Railway zone of Indian Railways. This railway division was formed on 1 April 2003 and its headquarter is located at Ranchi in the state of Jharkhand of India.

Kharagpur railway division, Chakradharpur railway division and Adra railway division are the other three railway divisions under SER Zone headquartered at Garden Reach, Calcutta.

List of railway stations and towns 
The list includes the stations  under the Ranchi railway division and their station category. 

Stations closed for Passengers -

References

 
Divisions of Indian Railways
2003 establishments in Jharkhand